Giessen is a town in Hesse, Germany.

Giessen may also refer to:

Giessen (district), district of Hesse, Germany
Giessen (region), region of Hesse, Germany
Giessen, Netherlands, a village in the municipality of Altena
The former German name of what is today the town of Jeże, Lubusz_Voivodeship, Poland

See also
Giesen, a village in Lower Saxony, Germany